Wierzchosławice  is a village in Tarnów County, Lesser Poland Voivodeship, in southern Poland. It is the seat of the gmina (administrative district) called Gmina Wierzchosławice.

The village has a population of 3,000.

Notable people 
 Birthplace of Wincenty Witos, agrarian leader and Prime Minister of Poland

References

Villages in Tarnów County